Altınordu İdman Yurdu were a Turkish sports club based in Istanbul, Turkey. Founded in 1909 under the name Progres FC, the football department of the club became champions in the Istanbul Football League in the 1916–17 and 1917–18 seasons. The club colours were red and navy blue.

History
Altınordu İdman Yurdu were founded by Aydınoğlu Raşit Bey under the name Progres FC in 1909 by footballers who left Galatasaray. In 1914, Talat Pasha became the club president and the team became the football club of the Committee of Union and Progress party. Also in 1914, the club changed their name to Altınordu İdman Yurdu and soon gained considerable success in the Istanbul Football League. They eventually dissolved in 1926.

Honours
 Istanbul Football League
 Winners (2): 1916–17, 1917–18

See also
 List of Turkish sports clubs by foundation dates

References

 Tuncay, Bülent (2002). Galatasaray Tarihi. Yapı Kredi Yayınları 
 Dağlaroğlu, Rüştü. Fenerbahçe Spor Kulübü Tarihi 1907–1957
 Altınordu İdman Yurdu. Türk Futbol Tarihi vol.1. page(25). (June 1992) Türkiye Futbol Federasyonu Yayınları.

Defunct football clubs in Turkey
Sports clubs established in 1909
Sports clubs disestablished in 1926
Association football clubs established in 1909
Association football clubs disestablished in 1926
Sport in Istanbul
1909 establishments in the Ottoman Empire
1926 disestablishments in Turkey